Cristina Ebner (born 3 September 1938) is an Italian alpine skier. She competed in the women's slalom at the 1956 Winter Olympics.

References

1938 births
Living people
Italian female alpine skiers
Olympic alpine skiers of Italy
Alpine skiers at the 1956 Winter Olympics
Place of birth missing (living people)